Hortiboletus bubalinus is a species of bolete fungus in the family Boletaceae. Originally described in 1991 as a species of Boletus, the fungus was transferred to Xerocomus in 1993. It was transferred to Hortiboletus by Bálint Dima in 2015.

References

External links

Boletaceae
Fungi described in 1991
Fungi of Europe